Argos is a city in Argolis, Peloponnese, Greece and is one of the oldest continuously inhabited cities in the world, and the oldest in Europe. It is the largest city in Argolis and a major center for the area.
 
Since the 2011 local government reform it has been part of the municipality of Argos-Mykines, of which it is a municipal unit. The municipal unit has an area of 138.138 km2. A settlement of great antiquity, Argos has been continuously inhabited as at least a substantial village for the past 7,000 years.

A resident of the city of Argos is known as an Argive. However, this term is also used to refer to those ancient Greeks generally who assaulted the city of Troy during the Trojan War; the term is more widely applied by the Homeric bards.

Numerous ancient monuments can be found in the city today. Agriculture is the mainstay of the local economy.

Geography

Climate
Argos has a hot Mediterranean climate. It is one of the hottest places in Greece during summer.

Etymology 
There are several proposed etyma. The name is associated with the legendary Argus, the third king of the city in ancient times, who renamed it after himself, thus replacing its older name Phoronikon Asty (Φορωνικόν Άστυ, "Citadel of Phoroneus"). Both the personal name and placename are linked to the word αργός (argós), which meant "white" or "shining"; possibly, this had to do with the visual impression given of the Argolic plain during harvest time. According to Strabo, the name could have even originated from the word αγρός "field" by antimetathesis of the consonants.

History

Antiquity

Herodotus first recorded the myth of the traditional story of Argos being the origin of the ancient Macedonian royal house of the Argead dynasty (Greek: Ἀργεάδαι, Argeádai) of Philip II and Alexander the Great. As a strategic location on the fertile plain of Argolis, Argos was a major stronghold during the Mycenaean era. In classical times, Argos was a powerful rival of Sparta for dominance over the Peloponnese, but was eventually shunned by other Greek city-states after remaining neutral during the Greco-Persian Wars. 

There is evidence of continuous settlement in the area starting with a village about 7,000 years ago in the late Neolithic, located on the foot of Aspida hill. Since that time, Argos has been continually inhabited at the same geographical location. And while the name Argos is generally accepted to have a Hellenic Indo-European etymology, Larissa is generally held to derive from a Pre-Greek substrate.

The city is located at a rather propitious area, among Nemea, Corinth and Arcadia. It also benefitted from its proximity to lake Lerna, which, at the time, was at a distance of one kilometre from the south end of Argos.

Argos was a major stronghold of Mycenaean times, and along with the neighbouring acropolis of Mycenae and Tiryns became a very early settlement because of its commanding positions in the midst of the fertile plain of Argolis.

Archaic Argos

Argos experienced its greatest period of expansion and power under the energetic 7th century BC ruler King Pheidon. Under Pheidon, Argos regained sway over the cities of the Argolid and challenged Sparta’s dominance of the Peloponnese. Spartan dominance is thought to have been interrupted following the Battle of Hyssiae in 669–668 BC, in which Argive troops defeated the Spartans in a hoplite battle. During the time of its greatest power, the city boasted a pottery and bronze sculpturing school, pottery workshops, tanneries and clothes producers. Moreover, at least 25 celebrations took place in the city, in addition to a regular local products exhibition. A sanctuary dedicated to Hera was also found at the same spot where the monastery of Panagia Katekrymeni is located today. Pheidon also extended Argive influence throughout Greece, taking control of the Olympic Games away from the citizens of Elis and appointing himself organizer during his reign. Pheidon is also thought to have introduced reforms for standard weight and measures in Argos, a theory further reinforced with the unearthing of six "spits" of iron in an Argive Heraion, possibly remainders of a dedication from Pheidon.

Classical Argos

In 494 BC, Argos suffered a crushing defeat at the hands of its regional rival, Sparta, at the Battle of Sepeia. Following this defeat, Herodotus tells us the city suffered a form of stasis. The political chaos is thought to have resulted in a democratic transition in the city. Argos did not participate in the Hellenic Alliance against the Persian Invasion of 480 BC. This resulted in a period of diplomatic isolation, although there is evidence of an Argive alliance with Tegea prior to 462 BC.

In 462 BC, Argos joined a tripartite alliance with Athens and Thessaly. This alliance was somewhat dysfunctional, however, and the Argives are only thought to have provided marginal contributions to the alliance at the Battle of Oenoe and Tanagra. For example, only 1,000 Argive hoplites are thought to have fought alongside the Athenians at the Battle of Tanagra. Following the allies' defeat at Tanagra in 457 BC, the alliance began to fall apart, resulting in its dissolution in 451 BC.

Argos remained neutral or the ineffective ally of Athens during the Archidamian War between Sparta and Athens. Argos' neutrality resulted in a rise of its prestige among other Greek cities, and Argos used this political capital to organize and lead an alliance against Sparta and Athens in 421 BC. This alliance included Mantinea, Corinth, Elis, Thebes, Argos, and eventually Athens. This alliance fell apart, however, after the allied loss at the Battle of Mantinea in 418 BC. This defeat, combined with the raiding of the Argolid by the Epidaurians, resulted in political instability and an eventual oligarchic coup in 417 BC. Although democracy was restored within a year, Argos was left permanently weakened by this coup. This weakening led to a loss of power, which in turn led to the shift of commercial focus from the Ancient Agora to the eastern side of the city, delimited by Danaou and Agiou Konstadinou streets.

Argos played a minor role in the Corinthian Wars against Sparta, and for a short period of time considered uniting with Corinth to form an expanded Argolid state. For a brief period of time, the two poleis combined, but Corinth quickly rebelled against Argive domination, and Argos returned to its traditional boundaries. After this, Argos continued to remain a minor power in Greek affairs.

Argos escaped occupation by Macedon during the reigns of Philip II and Alexander the Great and remained unscathed during the Wars of the Diadochi, however in 272 it was attacked by Pyrrhus of Epirus at the Battle of Argos, in which Pyrrhus was killed.

Democracy in Classical Argos

Argos was a democracy for most of the classical period, with only a brief hiatus between 418 and 416. Democracy was first established after a disastrous defeat by the Spartans at the Battle of Sepeia in 494. So many Argives were killed in the battle that a revolution ensued, in which previously disenfranchised outsiders were included in the state for the first time.

Argive democracy included an Assembly (called the aliaia), a Council (the bola), and another body called 'The Eighty,' whose precise responsibilities are obscure. Magistrates served six-month terms of office, with few exceptions, and were audited at the end of their terms. There is some evidence that ostracism was practiced.

Roman period

Under Roman rule, Argos was part of the province of Achaea. While prosperous during the early principate, Argos along with much of Greece and the Balkans experienced disasters during the Crisis of the 3rd Century when external threats and internal revolts left the Empire in turmoil. During Gallienus' reign, marauding bands of Goths and Heruli sailed down from the Black Sea in 267 A.D. and devastated the Greek coastline and interior. Athens, Sparta, Corinth, Thebes and Argos were all sacked. Gallienus finally cut off their retreat north and destroyed them with great slaughter at Naissus in Moesia.

With the death of the last emperor over a unified Empire, Theodosius I, the Visigoths under their leader Alaric I descended into Greece in 396-397 A.D., sacking and pillaging as they went. Neither the eastern or western Roman warlords, Rufinus (consul) or Stilicho, made an effective stand against them due to the political situation between them. Athens and Corinth were both sacked. While the exact level of destruction for Argos is disputed due to the conflicting nature of the ancient sources, the level of damage to the city and people was considerable. Stilicho finally landed in western Greece and forced the Visigoths north of Epirus. Sites said to have been destroyed in Argos include the Hypostyle hall, parts of the agora, the odeion, and the Aphrodision.

Byzantine, Crusader and Ottoman rule
Under Byzantine rule it was part of the theme of Hellas, and later of the theme of the Peloponnese.

In the aftermath of the Fourth Crusade, the Crusaders captured the castle built on Larisa Hill, the site of the ancient acropolis, and the area became part of the lordship of Argos and Nauplia. In 1388 it was sold to the Republic of Venice, but was taken by the Despot of the Morea Theodore I Palaiologos before the Venetians could take control of the city; he sold it anyway to them in 1394. The Crusaders established a Latin bishopric. Venetian rule lasted until 1463, when the Ottomans captured the city.

In 1397, the Ottomans plundered Argos, carrying off much of the population, to sell as slaves. The Venetians repopulated the town and region with Albanian settlers, granting them long-term agrarian tax exemptions. Together with the Greeks of Argos, they supplied stratioti troops to the armies of Venice. Some historians consider the French military term "argoulet" to derive from the Greek "argetes", or inhabitant of Argos, as a large number of French stratioti came from the plain of Argos.

During Ottoman rule, Argos was divided in four mahalas, or quarters; the Greek (Rûm) mahala, Liepur mahala, Bekir Efenti mahala and Karamoutza or Besikler mahala, respectively corresponding to what is now the northeastern, the northwestern, the southwestern and southeastern parts of the city. The Greek mahala was also called the "quarter of the unfaithful of Archos town" in Turkish documents, whereas Liepur mahala (the quarter of the rabbits) was composed mostly of Albanian emigrants and well-reputed families. Karamoutza mahala was home to the most prominent Turks and boasted a mosque (modern-day church of Agios Konstadinos), a Turkish cemetery, Ali Nakin Bei's serail, Turkish baths and a Turkish school. It is also at this period when the open market of the city is first organised on the site north to Kapodistrias' barracks, at the same spot where it is held in modern times. A mosque would have existed there, too, according to the city planning most Ottoman cities followed.

Argos grew exponentially during this time, with its sprawl being unregulated and without planning. As French explorer Pouqueville noted, "its houses are not aligned, without order, scattered all over the place, divided by home gardens and uncultivated areas". Liepur mahala appears to have been the most organised, having the best layout, while Bekir mahala and Karamoutza mahala were the most labyrinthine. However, all quarters shared the same type of streets; firstly, they all had main streets which were wide, busy and public roads meant to allow for communication between neighbourhoods (typical examples are, to a great extent, modern-day Korinthou, Nafpliou and Tripoleos streets). Secondary streets were also common in all four quarters since they lead to the interior of each mahala, having a semi-public character, whereas the third type of streets referred to dead-end private alleys used specifically by families to access their homes. Remnants of this city layout can be witnessed even today, as Argos still preserves several elements of this Ottoman type style, particularly with its long and complicated streets, its narrow alleys and its densely constructed houses.

Independence and modern history
With the exception of a period of Venetian domination in 1687–1715, Argos remained in Ottoman hands until the beginning of the Greek War of Independence in 1821, when wealthy Ottoman families moved to nearby Nafplio due to its stronger walling.

At that time, as part of the general uprising, many local governing bodies were formed in different parts of the country, and the "Consulate of Argos" was proclaimed on 28 March 1821, under the Peloponnesian Senate. It had a single head of state, Stamatellos Antonopoulos, styled "Consul", between 28 March and 26 May 1821.

Later, Argos accepted the authority of the unified Provisional Government of the First National Assembly at Epidaurus, and eventually became part of the Kingdom of Greece. With the coming of governor Ioannis Kapodistrias, the city underwent efforts of modernisation. Being an agricultural village, the need for urban planning was vital. For this reason, in 1828, Kapodistrias himself appointed mechanic Stamatis Voulgaris as the creator of a city plan which would offer Argos big streets, squares and public spaces. However, both Voulgaris and, later, French architect de Borroczun's plans were not well received by the locals, with the result that the former had to be revised by Zavos. Ultimately, none of the plans were fully implemented. Still, the structural characteristics of de Borroczun's plan can be found in the city today, despite obvious proof of pre-revolutionary layout, such as the unorganised urban sprawl testified in the area from Inachou street to the point where the railway tracks can be found today.

After talks concerning the intentions of the Greek government to move the Greek capital from Nafplio to Athens, discussions regarding the possibility of Argos also being a candidate as the potential new capital became more frequent, with supporters of the idea claiming that, unlike Athens, Argos was naturally protected by its position and benefited from a nearby port (Nafplio). Moreover, it was maintained that construction of public buildings would be difficult in Athens, given that most of the land was owned by the Greek church, meaning that a great deal of expropriation would have to take place. On the contrary, Argos did not face a similar problem, having large available areas for this purpose. In the end, the proposition of the Greek capital being moved to Argos was rejected by the father of king Otto, Ludwig, who insisted in making Athens the capital, something which eventually happened in 1834.

During the German occupation, Argos airfield was frequently attacked by Allied forces. One of the raids was so large that it resulted in the bombing of the city on October 14, 1943, with the casualties of about 100 dead Argives and several casualties, and 75 of the Germans. The bombing started from the airfield heading southeast, hitting the monastery of Katakrykmeni and several areas of the city, up to the railway station.

Mythology
The mythological kings of Argos are (in order): Inachus, Phoroneus, Apis, Argus, Criasus, (Phorbas, Triopas is sometimes between Criasus and Iasus in some sources), Iasus, Agenor,( Crotopus and Sthenelus was between Agenor and Gelanor in some sources), Gelanor AKA Pelasgus, Danaus, Lynceus, Abas, Proetus, Acrisius, Perseus, Megapenthes, (Argeus and Anaxagoras comes after in some sources).
An alternative version supplied by Tatian of the original 17 consecutive kings of Argos includes Apis, Argios, Kriasos and Phorbas between Argus and Triopas, explaining the apparent unrelation of Triopas to Argus.

The city of Argos was believed to be the birthplace of the mythological character Perseus, the son of the god Zeus and Danaë, who was the daughter of the king of Argos, Acrisius.

After the original 17 kings of Argos, there were three kings ruling Argos at the same time (see Anaxagoras), one descended from Bias, one from Melampus, and one from Anaxagoras. Melampus was succeeded by his son Mantius, then Oicles, and Amphiaraus, and his house of Melampus lasted down to the brothers Alcmaeon and Amphilochus.

Anaxagoras was succeeded by his son Alector, and then Iphis. Iphis left his kingdom to his nephew Sthenelus, the son of his brother Capaneus.

Bias was succeeded by his son Talaus, and then by his son Adrastus who, with Amphiaraus, commanded the disastrous war of the Seven against Thebes. Adrastus bequeathed the kingdom to his son, Aegialeus, who was subsequently killed in the war of the Epigoni. Diomedes, grandson of Adrastus through his son-in-law Tydeus and daughter Deipyle, replaced Aegialeus and was King of Argos during the Trojan war. This house lasted longer than those of Anaxagoras and Melampus, and eventually the kingdom was reunited under its last member, Cyanippus, son of Aegialeus, soon after the exile of Diomedes.

Ecclesiastical history
After Christianity became established in Argos, the first bishop documented in extant written records is Genethlius, who in 448 AD took part in the synod called by Archbishop Flavian of Constantinople that deposed Eutyches from his priestly office and excommunicated him. The next bishop of Argos, Onesimus, was at the 451 Council of Chalcedon. His successor, Thales, was a signatory of the letter that the bishops of the Roman province of Hellas sent in 458 to Byzantine Emperor Leo I the Thracian to protest the killing of Proterius of Alexandria. Bishop Ioannes was at the Third Council of Constantinople in 680, and Theotimus at the Photian Council of Constantinople (879). The local see is today the Greek Orthodox Metropolis of Argolis.

Under 'Frankish' Crusader rule, Argos became a Latin Church bishopric in 1212, which lasted as a residential see until Argos was taken by the Ottoman Empire in 1463  but would be revived under the second Venetian rule in 1686. Today the diocese is a Catholic titular see.

Characteristics

Orientation
The city of Argos is delimited to the north by dry river Xerias, to the east by Inachos river and Panitsa stream (which emanates from the latter), to the west by the Larissa hill (site of homonymous castle and of a monastery called Panagia Katakekrymeni-Portokalousa) and the Aspida Hill (unofficially Prophetes Elias hill), and to the south by the Notios Periferiakos road.

The Agios Petros (Saint Peter) square, along with the eponymous cathedral (dedicated to saint Peter the Wonderworker), make up the town centre, whereas some other characteristic town squares are the Laiki Agora (Open Market) square, officially Dimokratias (Republic) square, where, as implied by its name, an open market takes place twice a week, Staragora (Wheat Market), officially Dervenakia square, and Dikastirion (Court) square. Bonis Park is an essential green space of the city.

Currently, the most commercially active streets of the city are those surrounding the Agios Petros square (Kapodistriou, Danaou, Vassileos Konstantinou streets) as well as Korinthou street. The Pezodromi (Pedestrian Streets), i.e. the paved Michael Stamou, Tsaldari and Venizelou streets, are the most popular meeting point, encompassing a wide variety of shops and cafeterias. The neighborhood of Gouva, which extends around the intersection of Vassileos Konstantinou and Tsokri streets, is also considered a commercial point.

Population
In 700 BC there were at least 5,000 people living in the city. In the fourth century BC, the city was home to as many as 30,000 people.
Today, according to the 2011 Greek census, the city has a population of 22,085. It is the largest city in Argolis, larger than the capital Nafplio.

Economy

The primary economic activity in the area is agriculture. Citrus fruits are the predominant crop, followed by olives and apricots. The area is also famous for its local melon variety, Argos melons (or Argitiko). There is also important local production of dairy products, factories for fruits processing.

Considerable remains of the ancient and medieval city survive and are a popular tourist attraction.

Monuments
Most of Argos' historical and archaeological monuments are currently unused, abandoned, or only partially renovated:

 The Larissa castle, built during prehistoric time, which has undergone several repairs and expansions since antiquity and played a significant historical role during the Venetian domination of Greece and the Greek War of Independence. It is located on top of the homonymous Larissa Hill, which also constitutes the highest spot of the city (289 m.). In ancient times, a castle was also found in neighbouring Aspida Hill. When connected with walls, these two castles fortified the city from enemy invasions. 
 The Ancient theatre, built in the 3rd century B.C with a capacity of 20,000 spectators, replaced an older neighbouring theatre of the 5th century BC and communicated with the Ancient Agora. It was visible from any part of the ancient city and the Argolic gulf. In 1829, it was used by Ioannis Kapodistrias for the Fourth National Assembly of the new Hellenic State. Today, cultural events are held at its premises during the summer months.
 The Ancient Agora, adjacent to the Ancient theatre, which developed in the 6th century B.C., was located at the junction of the ancient roads coming from Corinth, Heraion and Tegea. Excavations in the area have uncovered a bouleuterion, built in 460 B.C. when Argos adopted the democratic regime, a Sanctuary of Apollo Lyceus and a palaestra.
 The "Criterion" of Argos, an ancient monument located on the southwest side of the town, on the foot of Larissa hill, which came to have its current structure during the 6th-3rd century BC period. Initially, it served as a court of ancient Argos, similar to Areopagus of Athens. According to mythology, it was at this area where Hypermnestra, one of the 50 daughters of Danaus, the first king of Argos, was tried. Later, under the reigns of Hadrian, a fountain was created to collect and circulate water coming from the Hadrianean aqueduct located in northern Argos. The site is connected via a paved path with the ancient theatre.
 The Barracks of Kapodistrias, a preservable building with a long history. Built in the 1690s during the Venetian domination of Greece, they initially served as a hospital run by the Sisters of Mercy. During the Tourkokratia, they served as a market and a post office. Later, in 1829, significant damage caused during the Greek revolution was repaired by Kapodistrias who turned the building into a cavalry barrack, a school (1893-1894), an exhibition space (1899), a shelter for Greek refugees displaced during the population exchange between Greece and Turkey (since 1920) and an interrogation and torture space (during the German occupation of Greece). In 1955–68, it was used by the army for the last time; it now accommodates the Byzantine Museum of Argos, local corporations and also serves as an exhibition space.
 The Municipal Neoclassical Market building (unofficially the "Kamares", i.e. arches, from the arches that it boasts), built in 1889, which is located next to Dimokratias square, is one of the finest samples of modern Argos' masterly architecture, in Ernst Ziller style. The elongated, two corridor, preservable building accommodates small shops.
 The Kapodistrian school, in central Argos. Built by architect Labros Zavos in 1830, as part of Kapodistrias' efforts to provide places of education to the Greek people, it could accommodate up to 300 students. However, technical difficulties led to its decay, until it was restored several times, the last of which being in 1932. Today, its neoclassical character is evident, with the building housing the 1st elementary school of the town. 
 The old Town Hall, built during the time of Kapodistrias in 1830, which originally served as a Justice of the peace, the Dimogerontia of Argos, an Arm of Carabineers and a prison. From 1987 to 2012, it housed the Town Hall which is now located in Kapodistriou street.
 The House of philhellene Thomas Gordon, built in 1829 that served as an all-girls school, a dance school and was home to the 4th Greek artillery regiment. Today it accommodates the French Institute of Athens (Institut Français d' Athènes).
 The House of Spyridon Trikoupis (built in 1900), where the politician was born and spent his childhood. Also located in the estate, which is not open to public, is the Saint Charalambos chapel where Trikoupis was baptized. 
 The House of general Tsokris, important military fighter in the Greek revolution of 1821 and later assemblyman of Argos.
 The temple of Agios Konstadinos, one of the very few remaining buildings in Argos dating from the Ottoman Greece era. It is estimated to have been built in the 1570-1600 period, with a minaret also having existed in its premises. It served as a mosque and an Ottoman cemetery up to 1871, when it was declared a Christian temple.
 The chambered tombs of the Aspida hill.
 The Hellinikon Pyramid. Dating back to late 4th B.C., there exist many theories as to the purpose it served (tumulus, fortress). Together with the widely accepted scientific chronology, there are some people who claim it was built shortly after the Pharaoh tomb, i.e. the Great Pyramid of Giza, thus a symbol of the excellent relationship the citizens of Argos had with Egypt.

A great number of archaeological findings, dating from the prehistoric ages, can be found at the Argos museum, housed at the old building of Dimitrios Kallergis at Saint Peter's square. The Argos airfield, located in the homonymous area (Aerodromio) in the northwest outskirts of the city is also worth mentioning. The area it covers was created in 1916-1917 and was greatly used during the Greco-Italian War and for the training of new Kaberos school aviators for the Hellenic Air Force Academy. It also constituted an important benchmark in the organization of the Greek air forces in southern Greece. Furthermore, the airfield was used by the Germans for the release of their aerial troops during the Battle of Crete. It was last used as a landing/take off point for spray planes (for agricultural purposes in the olive tree cultivations) up until 1985.

Transportation

Argos is connected via regular bus services with neighbouring areas as well as Athens. In addition, taxi stands can be found at the Agios Petros as well as the Laiki Agora square.

The city also has a railway station which, at the moment, remains closed due to an indefinite halt to all railway services in the Peloponnese area by the Hellenic Railways Organisation. However, in late 2014, it was announced that the station would open up again, as part of an expansion of the Athens suburban railway in Argos, Nafplio and Korinthos. Finally in mid 2020 it was announced by the administration of Peloponnese Region their cooperation with the Hellenic Railways Organisation for the metric line and stations maintenance for the purpose of the line's reoperation in the middle of 2021. Unfortunately, as of November 2022, no steps have yet been taken to even prepare for an upcoming reopening of the railway lines, to the dismay of the local populus.

Education
Argos has a wide range of educational institutes that also serve neighbouring sparsely populated areas and villages. In particular, the city has seven dimotika (primary schools), four gymnasia (junior high), three lyceums (senior high), one vocational school, one music school as well as a Touristical Business and Cooking department and a post-graduate ASPETE department. The city also has two public libraries.

Sports
Argos hosts two major sport clubs with presence in higher national divisions and several achievements, Panargiakos F.C. football club, founded in 1926 and AC Diomidis Argous handball club founded in 1976. Other sport clubs that are based in Argos: A.E.K. Argous, Apollon Argous, Aristeas Argous, Olympiakos Argous, Danaoi and Panionios Dalamanaras.

Notable people
Acrisius, mythological king
Theoclymenus, mythological prophet
Agamemnon, legendary leader of the Achaeans in the Trojan War
Acusilaus (6th century BC), logographer and mythographer
Ageladas (6th–5th century BC), sculptor
Calchas (8th century BC), Homeric mythological seer
Karanos (8th century BC), founder of the Macedonian Argead Dynasty
Leo Sgouros (13th century), Byzantine despot
Nikon the Metanoeite (10th century), Christian saint of Armenian origin, according to some sources born in Argos
Pheidon (7th century BC), king of Argos
Argus (7th century BC), king of Argos
Polykleitos (5th–4th century BC), sculptor
Polykleitos the Younger (4th century BC), sculptor
Telesilla (6th century BC), Greek poet
Bilistiche, hetaira and lover of pharaoh Ptolemy II Philadelphus
Eleni Bakopanos (born 1954), Canadian politician
Samuel Greene Wheeler Benjamin (1837-1914), American statesman

International relations

Twin towns and sister cities
Argos is twinned with:
 Veria, Greece
 Abbeville, France
 Episkopi, Cyprus
 Mtskheta, Georgia (1991)

See also
 Argos (dog)
 Communities of Argos (municipal unit)
 Kings of Argos
 List of ancient Greek cities
 List of settlements in Argolis

Notes

Sources and external links

 
 Website of abolished Municipality of Argos (web archive)
 GCatholic with incumbent bio links
 The Theatre at Argos, The Ancient Theatre Archive, Theatre specifications and virtual reality tour of theatre

 
Populated places in ancient Argolis
Ancient Greek sanctuaries in Greece
Aegean palaces of the Bronze Age
Ancient Greek archaeological sites in Peloponnese (region)
Mycenaean sites in Argolis
Byzantine sites in Greece
Stato da Màr
Greek city-states
Populated places in Argolis